The rothphone (also rothophone, rothaphone, or saxsarrusophone) is a metal double reed conical bore wind instrument similar to the sarrusophone, but built with a saxophone shape.

History
The rothphone was invented by and named after Friedrich Roth, and manufactured by Bottali in Milan when they took over the Roth workshop in 1898. Like the sarrusophone, it was intended to replace oboes and bassoons in military bands.

The rothphone gained some popularity in Italian wind and military bands between World War I and World War II, but remained almost completely unknown outside Italy. When Bottali folded in the mid 1930s and was taken over by Milan instrument manufacturer Orsi, Orsi sold their stock of Bottali-made rothphone instruments as the "saxrusofono".

Construction

Rothphones were patented and introduced in five sizes in 1912 by Bottali, their only significant manufacturer:

 Soprano rothphone in B♭
 Alto rothphone in E♭
 Tenor rothphone in B♭
 Baritone rothphone in E♭
 Bass rothphone in B♭

Each instrument corresponded in range to the similar-sized sarrusophone or saxophone, and all are transposing instruments notated in treble clef. A contrabass was never built due to the similarity to the already established contrabass sarrusophone in bands of the time. The bore of the rothphone is narrower than that of either the sarrusophone or saxophone.

References

Double-reed instruments